Below are the rosters for the 2011 Copa Centroamericana in Panama, from January 14–23. Every national team's roster consists of 21 players with three goalkeepers included. Statistics of players are accurate as of before the start of the tournament.

Group A

Belize
Head coach:  José de la Paz Herrera

|-
|- style="background:#dfedfd;"

|-
|- style="background:#dfedfd;"

|-
|- style="background:#dfedfd;"

El Salvador
Head coach:  José Luis Rugamas

Nicaragua 
Head coach:  Enrique Llena

Panama
Head coach:  Julio Dely Valdés

Group B

Costa Rica

Head coach:  Ricardo La Volpe

Guatemala
Head coach:  Ever Almeida

Juan Jose Paredes Guzman GK 11/27/1984 C.S.D. Comunicaciones (Guatemala)
Riqui Nelson Murga Juarez MF 07/15/1980 Deportivo Marquense (Guatemala)
Fredy Omar Iboy Aguilar DF 04/18/1983 Deportivo Mictlan (Guatemala)

Honduras
Head coach:  Juan de Dios Castillo

References

Copa Centroamericana squads
squads